The Mountain Apple Company is a record label based in Honolulu, Hawaii, that specializes in traditional and contemporary music of Hawaii as well as other artists with a connection to Hawaii. It is known for popularizing the career of Israel Kamakawiwoʻole.

History 
It was founded and incorporated in 1977 by Jon de Mello, who is its chief executive officer, who named it when a Mountain Apple fell from a tree onto his tin roof right as he was trying to come up with a name for the company. In 2016, the Mountain Apple Company moved its office from Honolulu to Kailua. The company merged with Island Heritage, a Hawaiian merchandise company, later that year.

Artists 

 Alfred Apaka
 Keola & Kapono Beamer
 The Brothers Cazimero (Robert & Roland)
 Charles K. L. Davis
 Jack de Mello
 Troy Fernandez
 Taimane Gardner
 Amy Hanaialiʻi Gilliom
 Raiatea Helm
 Don Ho
 Willie K (Kahaialii)
 Kuana Torres Kahele
 Israel Kamakawiwoʻole
 Cecilio & Kapono
 Melveen Leed
 Arthur Lyman
 Brother Noland
 Mākaha Sons
 Bitty McLean
 Sean Na‘auao
 Dennis Pavao
 Bill Tapia
 Emma Veary
 Na Palapalai (band)
 Natural Vibrations (band)

As well as: Irmgard Aluli, Del Beazley, Don Baduria, Jimmy Borges, Kekuhi Kanahele, Kaumakaiwa Kanakaʻole, Nina Kealiʻiwahamana, Mailani, Sean Naʻauao, Anthony Natividad, Mary Kawena Pukui, Rap Reiplinger, Makua Rothman, Palani Vaughan, HAPA, and The Hawaiian Style Band.

See also 
 List of record labels

References

External links 
 

American record labels
Record labels established in 1977
Companies based in Hawaii
1977 establishments in Hawaii